Laskar Abdul Hariz @ Amani bin Herman (born 24 September 2000) is a Bruneian footballer who plays as a midfielder for MS ABDB of the Brunei Super League.

Club career

A native of Belait in west Brunei, Hariz attended St. James' School in Kuala Belait. A youth international since 2015, he began playing club football with the under-17 side of Tabuan Muda that played in the 2016 Brunei Premier League. His first club goal came when he scored the matchwinner against Rimba Star on 2 April. That goal helped Tabuan U17 finish in third place, with 18 points from nine matches. They also made it all the way to the semi-finals of the DST FA Cup where they were beaten by Najip I-Team in a feisty encounter.

Hariz moved up to the 'A' team of Tabuan Muda for the 2017 Brunei Super League season. He played regularly for Takao Fujiwara's boys and contributed four goals in that season, including the leveller in a fortunate 2–2 draw against Lun Bawang on 9 July. Tabuan Muda 'A' finished the season in sixth place.

Fresh after his inclusion to the full national team, Hariz was snapped up by Brunei's professional club DPMM FC in February 2018 after a trial. He made his debut at home against Albirex Niigata (S) in a 1–3 loss on 7 August later that year.

After making four appearances for the Gegar Gegar men, Hariz left DPMM FC for Kasuka FC in 2019, scoring two goals in his short stint there. He joined MS ABDB in 2021.

International career 

Hariz's first international tournament was the 2015 AFF U-16 Youth Championship hosted by Cambodia in July–August. He scored a consolation in the 66th minute against Vietnam in the second group game which Brunei lost 1–6. He appeared in all five matches as Brunei finished bottom of their table. He was pushed into a higher age category a month later at the 2016 AFC U-19 Championship qualification matches that were held in Myanmar. Brunei only retained five players from the squad that went to Laos for the 2015 AFF U-19 Youth Championship a month ago. Appearing against Vietnam and Hong Kong, Hariz suffered a 0–5 drubbing in both games.

Exactly two years later, Hariz travelled with Tabuan Muda 'A' to Myanmar for the 2017 AFF U-18 Youth Championship. After a thrilling 2–3 win over the Philippines, heavy defeats by Vietnam, Myanmar and Indonesia curtailed the Young Wasps' progress to the knockout phase. The following November, Hariz was back on board for the 2018 AFC U-19 Championship qualification games to be played in Paju, South Korea. In the first match against Indonesia, he directed a header into his own net for the second goal in a 5–0 loss. This was followed by a 0–11 whitewash by the home team. Brunei fared better in the next match against neighbours Malaysia when the Young Wasps managed to frustrate their opponents right until the 76th minute. Blocking an attempt at goal, Hariz unfortunately deflected Zafuan Azeman's shot which looped past Abdul Mutalip Muhammad to give Malaysia a 1–0 win.

Despite the setbacks, Hariz never lost heart coming into the final game against Timor-Leste. Getting the nod to start the game by Fujiwara, Hariz netted a fine goal in the 34th minute to level the match after Danilson had given Timor-Leste the lead. The match ended in a 2–2 draw after further goals by Hanif Aiman Adanan and Danilson from the penalty spot.

Due to his performances in the local league as well as in his international appearances, Hariz earned a callup to the Brunei national team for the 2017 Aceh World Solidarity Tsunami Cup organised by Indonesia in December. Had the tournament be classified as full 'A'-international matches as previously planned, his second-half appearance against Indonesia would have made Hariz the first Bruneian international that was born after the millennium.

In February 2022, Hariz was selected for the under-23s to compete in the 2022 AFF U-23 Youth Championship held in Cambodia. A month later, he was also selected for the full national team for a friendly against Laos away in Vientiane. He made his international debut in the game, starting in midfield in a 3–2 loss.

References

External links

2000 births
Living people
Association football midfielders
Bruneian footballers
Brunei international footballers
DPMM FC players
Competitors at the 2019 Southeast Asian Games
Southeast Asian Games competitors for Brunei